Teruaki Yoshikawa (吉川 輝昭, born November 13, 1981) is a Japanese former professional baseball pitcher in Japan's Nippon Professional Baseball. He previously played for the Yokohama BayStars from 2004 to 2009 and again in 2013 and with the Fukuoka SoftBank Hawks from 2010 to 2012.

External links

NPB stats

1981 births
Baseball people from Saga Prefecture
Fukuoka SoftBank Hawks players
Japanese expatriate baseball players in Puerto Rico
Living people
Nippon Professional Baseball pitchers
Yokohama BayStars players
Yokohama DeNA BayStars players
Criollos de Caguas players